Aaron-Carl Ragland (August 19, 1973 – September 30, 2010), better known simply as Aaron-Carl, was an American electronic dance musician.

In 1999, he was the founder of the Detroit-based Wallshaker Music, an independent record label and music production company specializing in soulful house music, and of Cherry Juice Recordings, its European, Amsterdam-based, more Pop, record label. He was founder and CEO of W.A.R.M.T.H. International Inc. In addition to his own label, he also released materials on such respected labels as Ovum and the Underground Resistance, a sub-label Soul City as well as Rebirth, Metroplex, Subject Detroit and Universal France.

He remixed many Detroit techno artists, like Underground Resistance, Scan 7, DJ Bone, Aux 88 & Kelli Hand. In addition, he has remixed various house, R&B and other mainstream artists, including Dajae, GusGus, Manu Dibango, N'Dambi (with Keite Young) and Kindred the Family Soul, CeCe Peniston ("Above Horizons") and Michelle Weeks. 

His single "My House" was licensed by Josh Wink's label, Ovum Recordings, and became Aaron's first Billboard Top 40 Dance/Club hit. His music has been showcased in various feature films, most notably Maestro, a house music documentary by Josell Ramos, which featured original tracks "Sky" and "Oasis". 

His first Cherry Juice Recordings release, "Motion" (recorded and produced together with Laurent & Lewis) was elected "Best track" by Kevin Saunderson and Dave Clarke at the 2007 Amsterdam Dance Event.

Ragland appears in The Godfather Chronicles -- The Ghetto Tech Sound of Detroit. His remix of rapper Johnny Dangerous' "Topsy Turvy", in which Aaron-Carl makes a cameo appearance is featured in Pick Up the Mic, a documentary by Alex Hinton.

Death
Ragland died from lymphoma, aged 37, in Detroit, Michigan, on September 30, 2010.

Discography

Albums
 Uncloseted (2002)
 Detrevolution (2005)
 Bittersoulfulsweet: The Aaron-Carl Experience (2008)
 Laurent & Lewis feat. Aaron-Carl - Motion (2008)

Selected singles/EPs
 Wash It/Down (1996)
 Crucified (1996)
 Wallshaker (1997)
 Make Me Happy (1997)
 My House (1998)
 Down (1998)
 Closer (1998)
 Dance Naked (1999)
 Soldier (1999)
 The Boot (2001)
 The Answer/Down (2002)
 Sky (2003)
 Switch (2003)
 Homoerotic (2003)
 Hateful (2004)
 Tears (2006)
 Aaron-Carl & Benjamin Hayes - The Devolver EP (2007)
 If There Is A Heaven Remixes Vol. 1 (2008)
 Aaron-Carl Presents Erica LaFay (2009)

References

External links
Aaron-Carl MySpace site
Aaron-Carl at Discogs
Wallshaker Records official website
Wall shaker MyMusic site

1973 births
2010 deaths
Deaths from lymphoma
Deaths from cancer in Michigan
Musicians from Detroit